Wheeler Glacier is a glacier draining the north flank of Mount Fraser, flowing west-northwest for 2 miles (3.2 km) to the south coast of South Georgia. Surveyed by the SGS in the period 1951–57. Named by the United Kingdom Antarctic Place-Names Committee (UK-APC) for J.F.G. Wheeler, British zoologist and member of the scientific staff of the Discovery Investigations Marine Station, Grytviken, South Georgia, 1925–27 and 1929–30.

See also
 List of glaciers in the Antarctic
 Glaciology

References

Glaciers of South Georgia